Gold Reserves is a 1925 Soviet silent adventure film directed by Vladimir Gardin. The picture is considered lost.

Plot
The film is about the struggle between the Bolshevik underground and Red partisans in the rear of the frontier of the Kolchak troops, which ended in an attack on the enemy train, capture by the Kolchak unit and discovery of the carefully guarded gold reserves.

Cast
 Yevgeni Chervyakov as Zajtsev 
 Andrey Fayt 
 Galina Kravchenko 
 Leonid Yurenev

References

Bibliography 
 Wolfgang Beilenhoff. Poetika Kino: Theorie und Praxis des Films im russischen Formalismus. Suhrkamp, 2005.

External links 
 

1925 films
Soviet adventure films
Russian adventure films
Soviet silent films
1920s Russian-language films
Films directed by Vladimir Gardin
Lost Russian films
Soviet black-and-white films
1925 adventure films
1925 lost films
Lost adventure films
Lost Soviet films
Russian black-and-white films
Silent adventure films